An alternative universe (also known as AU, alternate universe, alternative timeline, alternate timeline, alternative reality, or alternate reality) is a setting for a work of fan fiction that departs from the canon of the fictional universe that the fan work is based on. For example, an AU fan fiction might imagine what would have taken place if the plot events of the source material had unfolded differently, or it might transpose the characters from the original work into a different setting to explore their lives and relationships in a different narrative context. Unlike typical fan fiction, which generally remains within the boundaries of the canon set out by the source material, alternative universe fan fiction writers explore the possibilities of pivotal changes made to characters' history, motivations, or environment, often combining material from multiple sources for inspiration. 

AU stories are also sometimes used in official, though typically non-canonical, story lines, written by the creators of the original canon material.

Alternative timelines
Stories with alternative timelines follow the established canon before veering away at a crucial moment, similar in concept to many entries in Marvel Comics' What If series and DC Comics' Elseworlds series. Some alternative timeline stories are called "fix-it fiction" because they rewrite the story so that the consequences of certain events are undone, although beginning events are the same.  Another example of a sub genre of the alternative timeline story is called a "do-over fiction", similar to "fix-it fiction" in which consequences of an event are undone, but in do-over fictions particularly the entire story is reset to the beginning, and the author creates an alternate timeline that diverges from the original canon of the work.

Plot switch
Plot switch stories take the characters from a series and place them in another time, place, or situation. A subset of this type called "familiar plot switch" takes the characters from a series and places them in a setting more familiar to the author. This type of context shift is one of the main sources of "high school fiction" in which all the characters are written going to high school.

"Reality" swaps
In a reality swap alternative universe (AU)—often in movies or television shows—the actors may find themselves in the fictional universe, the fictional characters may find themselves in the "real" universe, or the story may feature swaps both ways. This type of AU has appeared in mainstream publications as well. Fiction using real characters and borrowing from the 19th century include Edison's Conquest of Mars and Sherlock Holmes versus Jack the Ripper.
In Star Trek short stories written in the early 1970s, the actors from the Desilu set were swapped with the "real life" Starfleet officers via the transporter ("Visit To A Weird Planet"; "Visit To A Weird Planet, Revisited"). These fan fiction stories were later published in official Star Trek books. 

This concept was also used in an episode of  Supernatural, "The French Mistake" (Season 6, Episode 15). In the episode, the main characters Sam and Dean are transported to an alternative universe where they are actors named Jared Padalecki and Jensen Ackles, respectively, on a television show called Supernatural.

Crossovers

This type of alternative universe places two fictional universes in a situation where they interact, similar to reality swaps (which mix a fictional universe with the real world). Such stories sometimes involve "comparisons or conflict" between the combat prowess of the two universes, often involving the various strengths and weaknesses of the technology/magic of each world. This genre of fan fiction is distinct from plot switch in the fact that it usually involves characters from at least two separate series interacting with one another. Sometimes these stories involve the substitution of characters from one universe for those of another. Examples include Sherlock Holmes Versus Arsène Lupin, Sherlock Holmes vs. Dracula and Sherlock Holmes' War of the Worlds.

Predictive fiction
Alternative universes can arise inadvertently in fan fiction when the source material is released in a serial form (such as a multi-season television series or a book trilogy) so that fan works are written before further canonical information arrives. For instance, much Harry Potter fan fiction written in the nearly three years between the publication of Harry Potter and the Goblet of Fire and Harry Potter and the Order of the Phoenix was written as "continuation" fan fiction, but became AU as soon as the new canonical material appeared.

Changing canon
In alternative universe stories, characters' known motivations may vary considerably from their decisions in the canonical universe. The author of an alternative universe story thus can use the same characters, but send them down different paths to achieve a completely different plot. On occasions, a fan fiction writer creates a character which does not exist in the actual story that inspired it.

See also

Expanded universe
Future history

Parallel universes in fiction
Uberfic

References

Continuity (fiction)
Fan fiction
Multiple time paths in fiction
Setting